Earl Muetterties (June 23, 1927 – January 12, 1984), was an American inorganic chemist born in Illinois, who is known for his experimental work with boranes, homogeneous catalysis, heterogeneous catalysis, fluxional processes in organometallic complexes and apicophilicity.

Training 
Muetterties earned a bachelor's degree in chemistry at Northwestern University in 1949 and received his doctoral thesis in boron-nitrogen chemistry under Charles Brown and Eugene G. Rochow at Harvard in 1952.

Career

Career at DuPont
Earl Muetterties joined DuPont Central Research Department and was promoted to research supervisor in 1955. His early contributions were on the inorganic fluorine compounds, especially of sulfur and phosphorus. In collaboration with William D. Phillips he exploited NMR for study of dynamic processes in inorganic  fluoride compounds. Muetterties's work on boron hydride clusters led to the work on several polyhedral borane anions such as B12H122−. He was an inventor on some basic findings with the polyhedral borate anions. In addition to the polyhedral boranes, the program explored pi-allyl, fluoroalkyl, and boron hydride complexes of the transition metals. Research also extended to stereochemically-non-rigid complexes. In 1965, Muetterties became Associate Director in the DuPont Central Research. In addition to groups in homogeneous and heterogeneous catalysis, groups were established in the synthesis and spectroscopy of organometallic compounds. He was also a prolific inventor.

Academic career
Muetterties's academic ties started with an adjunct professorship in chemistry at Princeton University (1967–1969) and then at the University of Pennsylvania (1969–1973).  With the Monell Chemical Senses Center, his research interests extended to mammalian pheromones. After a two-month lectureship at Cambridge University in 1972, he assumed a professorship at Cornell University in 1973, conducting research on organometallic chemistry and homogeneous catalysis, sometimes in collaboration with Roald Hoffman.
In 1979, Muetterties moved to the University of California, Berkeley, where he continued research in homogeneous catalysis and cluster chemistry. At Berkeley he also worked on surface science, and he maintained a research facility at the Lawrence Berkeley Laboratory.

Muetterties helped establish the American Chemical Society journals Inorganic Chemistry and Organometallics. He was on the editorial board of Inorganic Syntheses and edited Volume 10. He also edited books on boron chemistry and transition-metal hydrides and wrote reviews on complexes with unusual coordination numbers. A tribute to Muetterties has also been published.

References

External links
 
 In Memorium: Earl Muetterties Tribute to Earl Muetterties by Roald Hoffman.
 Earl Muetterties Visiting Scholars Program at the University of California, Berkeley.

Inorganic chemists
20th-century American chemists
1984 deaths
1927 births
Harvard University alumni
DuPont people
Members of the United States National Academy of Sciences
UC Berkeley College of Chemistry faculty
Cornell University faculty
Directors of DuPont
Northwestern University alumni